Palos Heights is a city in Cook County, Illinois, United States. It is a southwest suburb of Chicago. Per the 2020 census, the population was 12,068.

Geography

Demographics

2020 Census
As of the 2020 census there were 12,068 people, 4,625 households, and 3,407 families residing in the city. The racial makeup of the city was 90.25% White, 1.91% Asian, 1.67% African American, 0.07% Native American, 1.32% from other races, and 4.78% from two or more races. Hispanic or Latino of any race were 5.35% of the population.

There were 4,625 households, out of which 44.24% had children under the age of 18 living with them, 62.46% were married couples living together, 9.04% had a female householder with no husband present, and 26.34% were non-families. 21.75% of all households were made up of individuals, and 15.16% had someone living alone who was 65 years of age or older. The average household size was 2.98 and the average family size was 2.55.

The city's age distribution consisted of 17.3% under the age of 18, 7.3% from 18 to 24, 19.2% from 25 to 44, 25.7% from 45 to 64, and 30.4% who were 65 years of age or older. The median age was 51.7 years. For every 100 females, there were 99.0 males. For every 100 females age 18 and over, there were 96.8 males.

The median income for a household in the city was $90,995, and the median income for a family was $105,134. Males had a median income of $64,583 versus $44,342 for females. The per capita income for the city was $44,721. About 3.8% of families and 5.7% of the population were below the poverty line, including 8.9% of those under age 18 and 5.3% of those age 65 or over.

Note: the US Census treats Hispanic/Latino as an ethnic category. This table excludes Latinos from the racial categories and assigns them to a separate category. Hispanics/Latinos can be of any race.

2000 Census
As of the 2000 census, there were 11,561 people, 4,123 households, and 3,133 families residing in the city. The population density was 2,978.6 people per square mile (1,150.1/km2). There were 4,268 housing units at an average density of 1,129.0 per square mile (435.9/km2). The racial makeup of the city was 96.39% White, 0.44% African American, 0.09% Native American, 2.06% Asian, 0.25% from other races, and 0.78% from two or more races. Hispanic or Latino of any race were 1.43% of the population.

The top five ancestries reported in Palos as of the 2000 census were Irish (27.2%), German (20.5%), Polish (14.1%), Italian (10.5%) and Dutch (9.1%).

There were 4,123 households, out of which 25.0% had children under the age of 18 living with them, 67.0% were married couples living together, 6.6% had a female householder with no husband present, and 24.0% were non-families. 22.2% of all households were made up of individuals, and 14.2% had someone living alone who was 65 years of age or older. The average household size was 2.54 and the average family size was 2.98.

In the city, the population was spread out, with 20.2% under the age of 18, 8.2% from 18 to 24, 18.6% from 25 to 44, 27.5% from 45 to 64, and 25.5% who were 65 years of age or older. The median age was 47 years. For every 100 females, there were 86.2 males. For every 100 females age 18 and over, there were 81.8 males.

The median income for a household in the city was $69,907, and the median income for a family was $81,100. Males had a median income of $61,786 versus $37,188 for females. The per capita income for the city was $32,895. About 2.6% of families and 3.2% of the population were below the poverty line, including 4.0% of those under age 18 and 4.1% of those age 65 or over.

Neighborhoods 
 
Palos Heights has the following neighborhoods, each with distinct characteristics:
Lake Katherine
Colonial Heights/Old Palos
Downtown
Ishnala
Laurel Glen
Navajo Hills
Oak Hills Country Club Village
Old Westgate
Westgate Valley

Government
Palos Heights is divided between three congressional districts. The City Council is made up of a mayor, city clerk, city treasurer and eight aldermen from wards:
Bob Straz (mayor)
Tom Kantas (city clerk)
James Daemicke (treasurer)
Aldermen Jeffrey Key & Don Bylut (1st Ward)
Aldermen Bob Basso & Jack Clifford (2nd Ward)
Aldermen Alan Fulkerson and Dolores Kramarski (3rd Ward)
Aldermen Michael McGrogan and Jerry McGovern (4th Ward)

The City Administrator is Dan Nisavic.

Education

Primary and secondary schools
Palos Heights is served by four school districts. The four districts are: Palos Heights School District 128, Palos Community Consolidated School District 118, Community High School District 218, and Consolidated High School District 230.

District 128 operates one pre-school (Indian Hill), two elementary schools (Chippewa and Navajo Heights), and a junior high school (Independence). District 118 also operates two elementary schools (Palos East and Palos West) and a middle school (Palos South). The district's Palos East elementary is situated within the city's boundaries.

Community High School District 218's Alan B. Shepard High School serves Palos Heights and several neighboring communities. Students can choose from more than 200 different courses, including advanced placement courses, foreign language, computer programming, computer-aided design, robotics, graphic design, and desktop publishing. In addition, students can participate in a full roster of sports.

Consolidated High School District 230's Amos Alonzo Stagg High School, located in Palos Hills, serves Palos Heights students living west of Harlem Avenue (Illinois Route 43). It also offers more than 200 courses designed to meet the academic needs of college-bound students and the training needs of career-oriented students.

Several private and parochial schools in Palos Heights offer alternatives to public school education. Among the schools are St. Alexander Catholic School, Palos Evangelical Lutheran Elementary School, Elim Christian School, Chicago Christian High School,  and Stone Church Christian Academy. The latter offers the full range of college preparatory, business, and technology courses. Kennedy School is in nearby Palos Hills. The Roman Catholic Archdiocese of Chicago operates the Catholic schools. Incarnation Catholic School closed in 2018.

Colleges and universities
Palos Heights students can readily commute to Moraine Valley Community College in nearby Palos Hills. Moraine Valley serves the local residents through classes, seminars, lectures, concerts, plays, and other activities. Trinity Christian College is also located in Palos Heights.

Public library
Palos Heights Public Library serves the community.

Historical facts
Palos Heights was incorporated on April 11, 1959 on its fourth attempt at the ballot with the results 850 to 684. It officially became a city on April 16, 1959. Shortly thereafter, Z. Erol Smith was elected its first mayor and was re-elected three times, serving until 1973.

In 1965, a group of scholars met in Palos Heights to discuss the need for a contemporary translation of the Bible. The necessity of the project was agreed upon, and shortly thereafter, the New International Version (NIV) was initiated in Palos Heights.

Notable people 

 Brian Bogusevic, outfielder with Houston Astros and Chicago Cubs
 Peter Brown, singer-songwriter, co-wrote Madonna's "Material Girl", was raised in Palos Heights
 Kendall Coyne Schofield, ice hockey Olympic gold medallist and forward with the PWHPA
 David Dombrowski, president, CEO, and general manager of Boston Red Sox
 Brendan Houlihan, former member of the Cook County Board of Review
 Jim Hughes, pitcher with Brooklyn Dodgers, Chicago Cubs and Chicago White Sox
 Arlene Kotil, professional baseball player
 Jennifer Lien, actress (Star Trek: Voyager)
 Christine Magnuson, two-time Olympic swimming medalist
 Ryan Murphy, USA Olympic swimmer
 Ed Olczyk, member of USA hockey team at 1984 Olympics, NHL player, coach and broadcaster
 Tony Pashos, retired professional football player
 Quentin Richardson, forward and guard with the Miami Heat
 Herb Schumann, former Cook County commissioner
 Robin Tunney, actress (The Craft, The Mentalist)

Transportation 
Palos Heights has a station on Metra's SouthWest Service, which provides daily rail service between the village of Manhattan and Chicago Union Station. Palos Heights is served by three Pace bus routes.

References

External links
City of Palos Heights official website

Cities in Illinois
Chicago metropolitan area
Cities in Cook County, Illinois
Populated places established in 1959
1959 establishments in Illinois